Donna M. Simon (born March 25, 1960) is an American  Republican Party politician who served in the New Jersey General Assembly, representing the 16th legislative district from January 30, 2012, until January 12, 2016. Prior to her Assembly career, she served on the Readington Township Committee. She lost her race for a third term in the Assembly to Democrat Andrew Zwicker in the November 2015 election.

Biography
Simon was educated at Kean College and the School of Cardiac Technology at Union County Technical Institute. She is trained as a cardiovascular specialist.

Simon joined the Readington Township Board of Health in 2009. She first ran for elected office in November 2010 for a seat on the Readington Township Committee and began her term in January 2011.

In November 2011, Peter J. Biondi died two days after he was re-elected to his Assembly seat representing the 16th legislative district. Simon was selected on January 19, 2012 as his replacement by a Republican Party convention of district delegates from Hunterdon, Mercer, Middlesex and Somerset counties. She was sworn in on January 30, 2012 to serve for one year.

A November 2012 special election was held to fill the remaining year of Biondi's term. Simon ran against the Democratic candidate, Marie Corfield, a Raritan Township art teacher who achieved fame for facing off against Governor Chris Christie at a 2010 town hall meeting. On November 7, a day after the election, unofficial results showed Simon leading Corfield by 1,700 votes, but Corfield refused to concede until all outstanding ballots were counted. On November 30, Corfield conceded after final results showed Simon winning by about 1,000 votes.

Simon was re-elected in 2013.  In the 2015 election, Simon and fellow incumbent Republican Jack Ciattarelli faced a strong challenge from Democrats Andrew Zwicker and Maureen Vella.  Election night results indicated that Ciattarelli placed first and was re-elected, Vella placed fourth, and the race for the second seat between Simon and Zwicker was "too close to call." Three days after the election, Zwicker held a 67-vote lead over Simon with some provisional ballots remaining to be counted.  On November 9, 2015, the final provisional ballots were counted, with Zwicker finishing with a 78-vote lead over Simon. On November 16, 2015, Simon conceded the race to Zwicker and Republican officials stated that no recount will be requested.

While in the Assembly, she served on the Assembly Education and Telecommunications & Utilities committees in addition to the Joint Committee on the Public Schools. Simon and her husband Michael and two children reside in Readington Township.

References

1960 births
Living people
New Jersey city council members
Politicians from Hunterdon County, New Jersey
Republican Party members of the New Jersey General Assembly
People from Readington Township, New Jersey
Women state legislators in New Jersey
Union College (New Jersey) alumni
Women city councillors in New Jersey
21st-century American politicians
21st-century American women politicians